Below is the list of mountain passes in Turkey

Mountain passes

Turkey
Mountain passes